The  is one of eight active brigades of the Japan Ground Self-Defense Force. The brigade is subordinated to the Northern Army and is headquartered in Sapporo, Hokkaidō. Its responsibility is the defense of South Western Hokkaidō.

The brigade was formed on 11 March 2008 with units from the disbanded 11th Infantry Division.

Organization 

 11th Brigade, in Sapporo
 11th Brigade HQ, in Sapporo
 11th Tank Battalion, in Sapporo, with 2x Squadrons of Type 90 Main Battle Tanks
 10th Rapid Deployment Regiment, in Takikawa, with 1x headquarters, 3x Type 96 armored personnel carrier, 1x 120mm F1 mortar, and 1x Type 16 maneuver combat vehicle company
 18th Infantry Regiment, in Sapporo, with 1x headquarters, 3x Type 96 armored personnel carrier, and 1x 120mm F1 mortar company
 28th Infantry Regiment, in Hakodate, with 1x headquarters, 3x Type 96 armored personnel carrier, and 1x 120mm F1 mortar company
 11th Artillery Battalion, in Sapporo, with 3x batteries of Type 99 155mm Self-propelled howitzers
 11th Reconnaissance Company, in Sapporo, with Type 87 armored reconnaissance vehicles
 11th Anti-Aircraft Artillery Company, in Sapporo, with Type 81 and Type 93 Surface-to-air missile systems
 11th Combat Engineer Company, in Sapporo
 11th Signal Company, in Sapporo
 11th Aviation Squadron, in Sapporo, flying UH-1J and OH-6D helicopters
 11th NBC-defense Company, in Sapporo
 11th Logistic Support Battalion, in Sapporo

External links
 Homepage 11th Brigade (Japanese)

Japan Ground Self-Defense Force Brigade
Military units and formations established in 2008